Zelenko is a Ukrainian language surname that is derived from the word "zeleny" ("зелений"), which means "green".

Alexander Zelenko (1871–1953), Russian architect
Herbert Zelenko (1906–1979), American politician
Paula Zelenko (born 1957), American politician
Yekaterina Zelenko (1916–1941), Ukrainian fighter pilot
Vladimir Zelenko (1973–2022), Ukrainian-American physician

See also
 

Ukrainian-language surnames